Spade bit may refer to:
Spade bit used on horses
Spade bit used on a drill